María Natividad Venegas de la Torre (8 September 1868 – 30 July 1959) was a Mexican Roman Catholic nun. Torre established the Daughters of the Sacred Heart of Jesus of Guadalajara (in latin Congregationem Sororum Filiarum Sacri Cordis Iesu) and assumed the new name of "María of Jesus in the Blessed Sacrament" in 1930.

She joined the Association of the Daughters of Mary on 8 December 1898 and later went on to establish her own small community of women who were devoted to the care of the sick. She served as a nurse throughout her life and in her own order that she founded for the purpose of catering to the needs of the ill; she was named Superior General in 1921.

Venegas de la Torre was canonized in 2000 as the first female Mexican saint.

Life
María Natividad Venegas de la Torre was born on 8 September 1868 in Mexico as the last of twelve children. Her mother died when she was sixteen and her family suffered financial hardships after this as a result. Her father died when she was nineteen, and she was taken in by a paternal aunt. A pious child, she spent her time giving religious instruction to neighbors and also cared for those who were poor.

She became a member of the Association of the Daughters of Mary on the Feast of the Immaculate Conception on 8 December 1898 and would later establish a small group of women devoted to the plight of the ill. She served in this capacity as a nurse as well as a bookkeeper and pharmacist. She entered religious life in 1905 and took her vows in 1910.

Torre established the Daughters of the Sacred Heart of Jesus of Guadalajara and was elected as Superior General of her new order on 25 January 1921. The Constitution of the order was approved in 1930. She worked for donations to establish a residence for the order in 1922, and this occurred during a period of widespread religious persecution during the Cristero Rebellion. During this period, she continued to operate her hospital and it only served to strengthen her congregation throughout this period. She catered to the needs of priests as well as seminarians.

She died in 1959.

Sainthood

The process
The canonization process commenced in Guadalajara on 19 June 1980 in a local process that saw the accumulation both documentation and witness testimonies. The commencement of the process conferred upon her the posthumous title Servant of God. The process spanned from 18 March 1981 until 7 April 1983 - it received the formal decree of ratification on 9 April 1984 in order for the cause to proceed to the next phase. The Positio was submitted to the Congregation for the Causes of Saints in Rome in 1987 for further evaluation.

She was proclaimed to be Venerable on 13 May 1989 after Pope John Paul II recognized that she had lived an exemplary Christian life of heroic virtue.

Beatification and canonization
The miracle for beatification was investigated locally in 1987 and was ratified in 1990. John Paul II approved the miracle in 1991 and beatified her in St. Peter's Basilica on 22 November 1992.

The second miracle that was required for canonization was also investigated and the process was ratified in 1995. John Paul II approved the miracle on 26 March 1999 and canonized her on 21 May 2000 as the first female Mexican saint.

The miracle for her canonization regarded Anastasio Ledezma Mora who was taken to her hospital for a surgical procedure. His heart rate slowly declined until total stoppage, and resuscitation techniques were tried in vain until he fell into a coma. Doctors and nurses, as well as his family, prayed to her for her intercession. His heart rate was restored after around ten minutes and he did not suffer any damage.

References

External links
Hagiography Circle

1868 births
1959 deaths
19th-century venerated Christians
20th-century venerated Christians
Mexican Roman Catholic saints
Beatifications by Pope John Paul II
Canonizations by Pope John Paul II
Founders of Catholic religious communities
People from Jalisco
Venerated Catholics by Pope John Paul II